KTM CTY is a Nepalese sportswear company that creates and produces apparel. It is best known for supplying the kit for the Nepalese national football team.

Sponsorships
KTM CTY provided kits to the following teams and athletes:

Football

National teams

Club teams
 Butwal Lumbini F.C.
 Himalayan Sherpa Club
 Manang Marshyangdi Club

Cricket
 Pokhara Rhinos

References

Sportswear brands
Nepalese brands
2013 establishments in Nepal